Fontenai-sur-Orne (literally Fontenai on Orne) is a former commune in the Orne department in north-western France. On 1 January 2018, it was merged into the commune of Écouché-les-Vallées.

See also
Communes of the Orne department

References

Fontenaisurorne